Walter Stapleton may refer to:

 Walter King Stapleton (born 1934), American judge
 Walter Stapleton (politician), New Hampshire politician

See also
 Walter de Stapledon, Bishop of Exeter and Lord High Treasurer of England
 Walker Stapleton, American politician